Santiago Martínez Perlaza (born 27 February 1998) is a Colombian footballer who plays as a midfielder for  Tampico Madero F.C. on loan from Santos Laguna.

References

External links
 
 

1998 births
Living people
Colombian footballers
Colombian expatriate footballers
Expatriate footballers in Mexico
Tampico Madero F.C. footballers
Ascenso MX players
Colombian expatriate sportspeople in Mexico
Association football midfielders
Footballers from Medellín